Chris Williams (born June 16, 1998) is an American football defensive tackle for the Indianapolis Colts of the National Football League (NFL). He played college football at Wagner.

College career
Williams was a member of the Wagner Seahawks for four seasons. While playing for the Seahawks, Williams recorded 105 tackles (41 solo) 22.0 tackles for a loss, 6 sacks 3 forced fumble, a single fumble recovery and 3 blocked kicks. Williams also earned Second-team All-NEC honors in 2018. In his senior season debut against UConn, he had 11 tackles. During Williams's senior year in 2019, he had 62 tackles, including four sacks and 11.5 tackles for loss. Williams earned First-team All-NEC honors.

Professional career
Williams was signed by the Indianapolis Colts following the 2020 NFL Draft to their practice squad.

In his first two preseason games in 2021, Williams recorded four tackles and one quarterback hurry and was praised by defensive tackle DeForest Buckner. On August 31, it was announced that Williams made the initial 53-man roster. He played in four games before being waived on October 19, but was re-signed to the practice squad. He signed a reserve/future contract on January 10, 2022.

On August 30, 2022, Williams was waived by the Colts and signed to the practice squad the next day. He was promoted to the active roster on October 11.

References

External links
Wagner Seahawks Bio
Indianapolis Colts Bio

1998 births
Living people
American football defensive tackles
Wagner Seahawks football players
Indianapolis Colts players
Players of American football from New York (state)
Sportspeople from Brooklyn
Players of American football from New York City